The Abu Dhabi Company for Onshore Petroleum Operations Ltd. (ADCO) operates onshore and in shallow coastal waters of the Emirate of Abu Dhabi, one of the seven members of the United Arab Emirates which was established on 2 December 1971.

The original concession agreement was made with Petroleum Development (Trucial Coast) Ltd on 11 January 1939, but geological work did not begin until after the Second World War. Exploratory drilling began in Abu Dhabi in February 1950.

The first commercial oil discovery was made at Bab in 1960, and exports began from the Jebel Dhanna terminal on 14 December 1963. In 1962, the Company was renamed the Abu Dhabi Petroleum Company, ADPC. On 1 January 1973, the Government of Abu Dhabi acquired a 25% interest, which was increased to 60% as from 1 January 1974. The Government interest is held by the Abu Dhabi National Oil Company, ADNOC.

On 15 October 2017, ADNOC brought together its people, resources, products and services together under a unified brand. 
Abu Dhabi Company for Onshore Petroleum Operations Ltd. (ADCO) was renamed ADNOC Onshore.

The Company produces mainly from six oil fields:
 Asab
 Sahil
 Shah
 Bab
 Buhasa
 North-East Bab (Dabbiya, Rumaitha and Shanayel)

The company also operates Buhasa Airport and Jebel Dhana Airport

References

Oil and gas companies of the United Arab Emirates
Energy companies established in 1971
1971 establishments in the Trucial States
1971 in the United Arab Emirates
1971 establishments in the United Arab Emirates
Emirati companies established in 1971

https://adnoc.ae/adnoc-onshore/notification